The United Nations Conference on Environment and Development (UNCED), also known as the Rio Conference or the Earth Summit (Portuguese: ECO92), was a major United Nations conference held in Rio de Janeiro from June 3 to June 14, 1992.

Earth Summit was created as a response for member states to cooperate together internationally on development issues after the Cold War. Due to issues relating to sustainability being too big for individual member states to handle, Earth Summit was held as a platform for other member states to collaborate. Since the creation, many others in the field of sustainability show a similar development to the issues discussed in these conferences, including non-governmental organizations (NGOs).

Issues addressed 
The issues addressed includes:
 systematic scrutiny of patterns of production—particularly the production of toxic components, such as lead in gasoline, or poisonous waste including radioactive chemicals 
 alternative sources of energy to replace the use of fossil fuels which delegates linked to global climate change
 new reliance on public transportation systems in order to reduce vehicle emissions, congestion in cities and the health problems caused by polluted air and smoke
 the growing usage and limited supply of water
 importance of protecting the world's oceans.

Development 
An important achievement of the summit was an agreement on the Climate Change Convention which in turn led to the Kyoto Protocol and the Paris Agreement. Another agreement was to "not to carry out any activities on the lands of indigenous peoples that would cause environmental degradation or that would be culturally inappropriate".

The Convention on Biological Diversity was opened for signature at the Earth Summit and made a start towards a redefinition of measures that did not inherently encourage the destruction of natural ecoregions and so-called uneconomic growth. World Oceans Day was initially proposed at this conference and has been recognized since then.

Although President George H. W. Bush signed the Earth Summit’s Convention on Climate, his EPA Administrator William K. Reilly acknowledges that U.S. goals at the conference were difficult to negotiate and the agency’s international results were mixed, including the U.S. failure to sign the proposed Convention on Biological Diversity.

Twelve cities were also honored with the Local Government Honours Award for innovative local environmental programs. These included Sudbury in Canada for its ambitious program to rehabilitate environmental damage from the local mining industry, Austin in the United States for its green building strategy, and Kitakyūshū in Japan for incorporating an international education and training component into its municipal pollution control program.

The Earth Summit resulted in the following documents: 
 Rio Declaration on Environment and Development
 Agenda 21
 Forest Principles

Moreover, important legally binding agreements (Rio Convention) were opened for signature:
 Convention on Biological Diversity
 Framework Convention on Climate Change (UNFCCC)
At Rio it was agreed that an International Negotiating Committee for a third convention the United Nations Convention to Combat Desertification would be set up. This convention was negotiated within two years of Rio and then open for signature it became effective in 1996 after receiving 50 ratifications. At this stage, youth were not officially recognised within climate governance.

In order to ensure compliance to the agreements at Rio (particularly the Rio Declaration on Environment and Development and Agenda 21), delegates to the Earth Summit established the Commission on Sustainable Development (CSD). In 2013, the CSD was replaced by the High-level Political Forum on Sustainable Development that meets every year as part of the ECOSOC meetings, and every fourth year as part of the General Assembly meetings.

Critics point out that many of the agreements made in Rio have not been realized regarding such fundamental issues as fighting poverty and cleaning up the environment.

Green Cross International was founded to build upon the work of the Summit.

The first edition of Water Quality Assessments, published by WHO/Chapman & Hall, was launched at the Rio Global Forum.

Youth 
Although youth were not given specific recognition, there was a significant youth turnout at UNCED. Youth were involved in negotiating Chapter 25 of Agenda 21 on Children & Youth in Sustainable Development.

"25.2 It is imperative that youth from all parts of the world participate actively in all relevant levels of decision-making processes because it affects their lives today and has implications for their futures. In addition to their intellectual contribution and their ability to mobilize support, they bring unique perspectives that need to be taken into account."

Two years prior to UNCED youth organized internationally to prepare for the Earth Summit. Youth concerns were consolidated at a World Youth Environmental Meeting, Juventud (Youth) 92, held in Costa Rica, before the Earth Summit.

“The involvement of today’s youth in environment and development decision-making…is critical to the long term success of Agenda 21” (UNCED 1992). 

Parallel to UNCED, youth organized the Youth '92 conference with participation from around the world. Organising took place before, but also afterwards. Many youth participants were dissatisfied with the rate of change.

See also
 Earth Summits - list of the other summits before and after Rio 1992 (the first one in 1972)
 Ecology summit
 Global Map
 Maurice Strong
 Precautionary principle
 Regional Forum on Environment and Health in Southeast and East Asian countries
 Severn Suzuki
 The Environmental Institute
 Tommy Koh - link to the Chairman of the Main Committee of the UN Conference on Environment and Development
 United Nations Conference on the Human Environment 1972
 United Nations Climate Change conference - a yearly summit held in the framework of the United Nations Framework Convention on Climate Change (UNFCCC)

References

External links 
 Documents from the United Nations Conference on Environment and Development (also known as UNCED or the Earth Summit)  held in Rio de Janeiro, Brazil, 1992
 United Nations Conference on Environment and Development, Rio de Janeiro, Brazil, 3–14 June 1992
 Water Quality Assessments pdf
 Video: Severn Suzuki, 12 years old, speaks for Environmental Children Organization UNCED 1992
 Address at Rio Earth Summit, Tenzin Gyatso Dalai Lama
 Agenda 21 at the Center for a World in Balance
 A critical New Internationalist keynote about the 1992 Rio Earth Summit
 Rio Summit, articles at the India Environment Portal
 Rio+20 on India Environment Portal

United Nations Framework Convention on Climate Change
Environmental conferences
1992 in the environment
1992 in Brazil
United Nations conferences on the environment
Diplomatic conferences in Brazil
20th-century diplomatic conferences
1992 conferences
1992 in the United Nations
Politics of Rio de Janeiro (state)
20th century in Rio de Janeiro
June 1992 events in South America